Ust-Tsareva is a rural locality (a settlement) in Pyatovskoye Rural Settlement, Totemsky District, Vologda Oblast, Russia. The population was 63 as of 2002.

Geography 
Ust-Tsareva is located 13 km southwest of Totma (the district's administrative centre) by road. Desyatina is the nearest rural locality.

References 

Rural localities in Tarnogsky District